John Edward "Pick" Quinn  (September 12, 1885 - April 9, 1956) was a Major League Baseball player. He batted and threw right-handed. In 1935, he was the manager of the Johnstown Johnnies in the Middle Atlantic League.

He was born in Framingham, Massachusetts and died in Marlboro, Massachusetts.

References

External links

1885 births
1956 deaths
Major League Baseball catchers
Philadelphia Phillies players
Baseball players from Massachusetts
Marion Glass Blowers players
Minor league baseball managers